("the System Company"), colloquially known as  ("the system") or  ("the company"), is a government-owned chain of liquor stores in Sweden. It is the only retail store allowed to sell alcoholic beverages that contain more than 3.5% alcohol by volume.

Systembolaget also sells non-alcoholic beverages, although this product segment represents less than half a percent of the company's total sales of beverages. The minimum age to buy alcohol at Systembolaget is 20 years. At Swedish restaurants and bars the legal age to buy alcoholic beverages is 18 years, though bars and clubs may voluntarily set an age limit higher than 18 if they prefer.

Systembolaget's stores must close no later than 20:00 on weekdays and 15:00 on Saturdays. On Sundays and public holidays all Systembolaget's stores are closed. Systembolaget's stores are also closed on Christmas Eve and Midsummer Eve.

Governing laws

There are several laws and rules governing how Systembolaget stores operate, such as:
 All products, including beer cans and bottles (except products that are not kept in stock and have to be pre-ordered), are sold individually. Pre-ordered products may sometimes only be sold in quantities corresponding with the minimum order accepted by the manufacturer. Some traditional Swedish shots are also sold in holiday packs.
 Discounts, such as "Buy 1, get 1 free" and "One can 20 kr two cans 30 kr" type deals, are prohibited.
 No product may be favored over another, which in practice means that the beers are not refrigerated, since otherwise all beer would have to be refrigerated which is too expensive.
 The minimum age to purchase beverages above 3.5% alcohol is 20 years of age. A main reason to have Systembolaget as a monopoly is to enforce this age limit. Several tests have shown that restaurants and food shops often sell 3.5% beer to people below the minimum legal age of 18.
 People who look under 25 have to show an identity document. This has to be certified identity cards from the Nordic countries, national identity card from an EU country or be a passport.
 Systembolaget is not allowed to sell alcoholic beverages to drunk people or to people that they have reason to believe are purchasing for someone under legal age.

Systembolaget has a strict monopoly status on alcohol sales to consumers in Sweden, except for restaurant and bars, where alcohol can be sold for immediate consumption (bottles must be opened and can't be brought home).
 Private import for own consumption is allowed, based on EU regulations and court cases, both during private travel and by postal package. Still Sweden is able to levy taxes on the receiver of alcohol sent by postal packages.
 Other companies (producers and importers) can sell directly to restaurant and bars (EU enforced rule).
 Producers of alcohol, such as vineyards, are not allowed to themselves sell bottles of their products to consumers, but have the right to sell them through the nearest Systembolaget shops if they are not large enough for nationwide sales.
 The only exceptions to the monopoly to consumers are export shops at airports, which can sell alcohol to people checked in for a flight outside the EU. Alcohol can not be sold on boats on Swedish waters, but the shop is opened at the border to international or foreign waters.

Taxation and pricing
As with other government-owned monopolies within free-trade areas, there are several aspects that govern the operation. All product selections and displays must be based on customer preferences, and every producer and distributor must be handled the same way. All marketing activities must be for the company itself and its own services, never for an individual product. This is also the reason why all products are taxed on alcohol content, not on price, and that all products are sold with the same profit margin. This explains why an off-brand vodka can be seen as very expensive when compared to a premium-brand spirit bottle of a similar size.

Beer is not so highly taxed anymore in order to protect Swedish breweries and their employment opportunities against purchase during travel abroad. It is  2.12 SEK per % alcohol and liter, which means 5.3 SEK for a 5% beer can (50 cl). Such a can usually costs about 10 SEK (0.88 EUR) at Systembolaget. For wine, the tax increases based on the wine's alcohol by volume. For 12% wine, the tax is 27.49 SEK per liter. For distilled products, the tax is 5.2697 SEK per % and liter (526.97 SEK per liter alcohol, or 263.48 SEK for 1 liter of 50%).

History

In 1766 the Swedish king, Adolf Frederick, decided, after several unsuccessful attempts at regulating alcohol consumption, to abolish all restrictions. This led to virtually every household making and selling alcohol.

At the turn of the 19th century, alcohol was highly popular among Swedes. An estimated 175,000 home distilleries had developed by this time, using tremendous amounts of grain and potatoes that otherwise would have been consumed as food to manufacture alcohol. It was later said that most men in Sweden abused alcohol. Women rarely drank alcohol, since it was considered inappropriate.

In 1830, the first moderate drinking society was started in Stockholm. In 1837, the Svenska Sällskapet för Nykterhet och Folkuppfostran (The Swedish Society for Temperance and Public Education) was founded as the country's first fully-fledged temperance organization. It was immediately promoted by the King, and quickly grew to 10,000 members with local chapters around the country. The Church of Sweden also strongly promoted temperance. Private gain from selling alcohol was strongly criticized by these groups; this opinion was embraced by doctors and members of the Church of Sweden. In 1850, the state began to regulate alcohol. In the city of Falun, a regional organization was established to regulate all alcohol sales in the city and ensure that sales were being done responsibly.

In 1860, a bar was opened in Gothenburg where the state had handpicked the employees and decided how the bar should be run; antisocial and or intoxicated people were to be excluded. This was where people both bought and drank their alcohol, and this subsequently became the foundation for the Gothenburg Public House System used in Norway, Finland and the UK. This was also the year it became illegal to sell to people under the age of 18. Similar state-regulated bars and stores began to open in other towns across the country, and they were hugely successful. Originally the profits were kept privately by the owners, but in 1870 it was decided that all profits should go to the state.

During the First World War, alcohol was strictly rationed. Thus, the state bars and stores started registering purchases. People were allowed only two liters of liquor every three months, and beer above 3.6% ABV (2.8% ABW) was banned. Gender, income, wealth and social status decided how much alcohol one was allowed to buy. A referendum on prohibition in 1922 advised government not to issue total prohibition. The rationing system was very unpopular. When even the temperance movement protested against it (they felt it encouraged consumption), the government decided a new policy was needed.

In 1955, all regional alcohol monopolies were merged into the present-day Systembolaget enterprise, and the above-mentioned rationing system was abolished, so people were allowed to start buying as much alcohol as they wanted from Systembolaget stores (as long as they are sober, over 21 and not suspected of buying for later private resale). This led to increased consumption, so the government increased taxes heavily and made it compulsory that everyone had to show ID to get served. There was also an age limit of 21, which in 1969 was lowered to 20. In 1965, it became legal for privately run stores to sell beer up to 4.5% with an age limit of 18. 12 years later, after alcohol consumption – especially that of light beers – rose dramatically, the limit was lowered to 3.5%.

Originally, Systembolaget customers were required to ask shop attendants or use desk service to retrieve desired products. This policy was based on the hypothesis that personal, face-to-face interaction would discourage patrons from buying in conspicuous quantities. Customers would not be permitted to serve themselves until 1991. This self service policy was gradually and subsequently expanded into all Systembolaget stores between 1991 and 2014. The last Systembolaget store to convert to self service was the branch at Högdalen in southern Stockholm, which was converted in October 2014. Still, several shops have their hard alcohol at the checkout where customers need to ask for it.

In September 1996, Systembolaget began sales of bag-in-box cask wine after the European Court of Justice ruled in favour of the Swedish brewery Spendrups after it complained that Systembolaget's earlier refusal to sell boxed wine violated the EU's free trade agreement with Sweden. By the mid-2000s boxed wine accounted for over half the volume of wine sold at Systembolaget.

In 2003, an almost free quota (for personal use) was allowed when traveling into Sweden from another EU country, resulting in lower sales for Systembolaget, especially in Scania, which borders Denmark by sea. Increase in Danish prices has resulted in people driving to Germany instead for purchase. Some cars have been stopped by Swedish police for overweight but not for alcohol import, since four people are collectively allowed to have a total of 800 liters of beer and wine, which is above the allowed load of many standard cars.

In June 2007, a panel of EU judges commented that restrictions on the private import of alcohol by postal package were unjustified; as a result, Sweden allowed this some time after.

Swedish municipalities retain the right to ban the establishment of Systembolaget shops within their jurisdiction. This has become more rare over time, because of a more liberal political attitude and because of the belief that other shops lose customers when people drive to other municipalities for shopping.

Corruption controversy

The corruption scandal first gained widespread media attention in the autumn of 2003, with Systembolaget issuing its first press release regarding the preliminary investigations on 7 November 2003. On 11 February 2005, 77 managers of Systembolaget stores were charged with receiving bribes from suppliers, and one of the largest trials in modern Swedish history followed. 18 managers were found guilty on 19 December, and then on 23 February another 15 managers were found guilty.

In January 2009 allegations were aimed against Fondberg & Co, the second largest supplier of wine to Systembolaget with a market share of 8.5%, concerning large payments made to the Gibraltar firm Bodegas, and are under investigation by the Swedish Tax Agency.

Advertisements
Systembolaget makes advertisements focused on the side effects of drinking, and the encouragement of drinking moderately. Many of their ads are focused at stopping teenagers from obtaining alcohol, and to press on people under 25 showing identification. During November 2008, Systembolaget launched a campaign where people under 25 would get a free pack of chewing gum saying "Thank you for showing ID" when showing their ID to the cashier before they were asked to.

Systembolaget is not allowed to advertise its products to increase its sales. However, since 2005 the producers are allowed to advertise their products in Sweden (only products of less than 15% alcohol, and not on radio and TV).

See also
 Alcohol monopoly
 Alcohol in Sweden
 Gothenburg Public Houses
 Temperance movement
 State store

Further reading
Graham Butler "Alcoholic Goods and Sweden: The EU Law of Private Imports, Retail Sale, and State Monopolies". Stockholm: Swedish Institute for European Policy Studies, 2022. .

Notes

References

External links
 Systembolaget – Official site
 Systembolaget Demystified – The Scandinavian Insider Magazine
 Systembolaget to pay SEK 40 million – The Scandinavian Insider Magazine

Government-owned companies of Sweden
Food and drink companies based in Stockholm
Alcohol monopolies
Alcohol in Sweden
Swedish companies established in 1955
Food and drink companies of Sweden